The Jew of Mogadore is an 1808 comic opera written by the British dramatist Richard Cumberland.

Cumberland had previously written a successful, sympathetic play The Jew about a Jewish moneylender. However The Jew of Mogadore met with critical hostility when it opened at the Theatre Royal, Drury Lane. The title character is a merchant operating out of Mogadore on the Moroccan coast.

References

Bibliography
 Schroeter, Daniel J. The Sultan's Jew: Morocco and the Sephardi World. Stanford University Press, 2002.

1808 operas
English comic operas
English-language operas
Plays by Richard Cumberland